The Sagaing University of Education, formerly known as Mandalay Institute of Education or Sagaing Institute of Education located in Sagaing, Sagaing Region, is one of two senior universities of education in Myanmar. Primarily began as a teacher training college in Mandalay, the university currently offers Bachelor of Education, Master of Education, MPhil, Doctor of Philosophy and Post Graduate Diploma in Multimedia Arts (PGDMA) degree programs in education to the prospective primary and secondary school teachers. 

In addition, for years, senior lecturers of Sagaing University of Education (SUOE) have been providing short-term pedagogical trainings ( mainly Educational assessment, management and administration courses) to the in-service educators from many universities and public schools under the Ministry of Education of Myanmar.

Affiliated universities and colleges
Along with the Yangon Institute of Education, the Sagaing Institute of Education is affiliated with 22 educational colleges located throughout the country.

 Bogalay Education College
 Dawei Education College
 Hlegu Education College
 Hpa-An Education College
 Kyaukphyu Education College
 Lashio Education College
 Loikaw Education College
 Magway Education College
 Mandalay Education College
 Mawlamyaing Education College
 Monywa Education College
 Meiktila Education College
 Myaungmya Education College
 Myitkyina Education College
 Pakokku Education College
 Pathein Education College
 Pyay Education College
 Sagaing Education College
 Taungoo Education College
 Taunggyi Education College
 Thingangyun Education College
 Yankin Education College

References

Universities and colleges in Sagaing Region
Universities and colleges in Myanmar
Education schools in Myanmar